BookExpo America (commonly referred to within the book publishing industry as BEA) was an annual book trade fair in the United States. BEA is almost always held in a major city over four days in late May and/or early June.  Nearly all significant book publishers in the United States, and many from abroad, have booths and exhibits at BEA, and use the fair as an opportunity to showcase upcoming titles, sell current books, socialize with colleagues from other publishing houses, and sell and buy subsidiary rights and international rights.  Authors, librarians, and buyers for book retailers also attend the event.

In later years, it was accompanied by the spin-off event BookCon, a literature fan convention oriented towards the general public.

History 
The event was founded as the American Booksellers Association Convention and Trade Show in 1947 and continued under this name until 1994, when Reed Exhibitions purchased a 49% share of the event. The following year, 1995, Reed took 100% control and renamed the convention BookExpo America.

From its beginning until 1970, it was held in Washington, D.C. Starting in 1971, it rotated through different cities (1971 Boston, 1972 Washington, 1973 Los Angeles, 1974 Washington, 1975 New York, and so on). In the 1990s and early 
2000s, BEA was often held in Chicago. BEA was held in Washington, D.C. in 2006, in New York City in 2007, and in Los Angeles in 2008. BEA was held at the Jacob K. Javits Convention Center in New York City from 2009 through 2015. BEA returned to Chicago in 2016.

The 2015 book fair featured Chinese publishers for the first time.

For a time, DigiCon from the International Digital Publishing Forum (IDPF) ran concurrently with BEA.   However, the IDPF was absorbed into the W3C in 2017; no further DigiCon events have been announced, though the W3C holds other conferences on digital publishing.

The 2020 edition was initially delayed from May 2020 to July 2020 due to the COVID-19 pandemic, but was later canceled. 
In December 2020, Reed Exhibitions announced that BookExpo America and sister events BookCon and Unbound would be "retired" indefinitely in order to "explore new ways to meet the community's needs through a fusion of in-person and virtual events."

See also
 Books in the United States

References

External links

BookExpo America coverage at C-SPAN

Book fairs in the United States
Recurring events established in 1947
1947 establishments in Washington, D.C.
2020 disestablishments in Washington, D.C.